William Thomas Trenell Brown (born July 5, 1983), known professionally as Willie B or by the stage name The Ichiban Don, is an American hip hop record producer and recording artist from Los Angeles, California. He is an original member of West Coast hip hop production team Digi+Phonics of Top Dawg Entertainment (TDE). He is also a member of the hip hop collective A Room Full of Mirrors, alongside fellow rappers Punch and Daylyt, among others.

Musical career 
On January 6, 2011, Willie B released a mixtape titled I'm Not a Producer hosted by DJ Age and featuring guest appearances from Jay Rock, Talib Kweli, Busta Rhymes, Little Brother, Crooked I, Kendrick Lamar, Bishop Lamont, Glasses Malone, and Kurupt. He is best known for producing Kendrick Lamar's "Ignorance Is Bliss" and "Rigamortis" from Lamar's Overly Dedicated and Section 80, respectively. He has also produced Ab-Soul's "Black Lip Bastard", and Schoolboy Q's "Gangsta in Designer (No Concept)", from his second studio album Habits & Contradictions, among other songs for TDE. Outside of TDE he has produced for artists such as Freddie Gibbs, Childish Gambino, Wale and Apollo the Great, among others. On July 27, 2013, he released the first ever Instagram-only instrumental mixtape.

Discography

Studio albums 
 Let There B Lyt  (2017)
 Heroes  (2021)

Mixtapes 
 I'm Not a Producer (2011)

Guest appearances

Production discography

2009 
 Bishop Lamont & Indef - Team America Fuck Yeah: Special Forces
 13. "B.O.B. (Barack Over Bad Guys)" (featuring Affion Crockett and Willie B)

2010 
 Ab-Soul - Longterm 2: Lifestyles of the Broke & Almost Famous
 07. "Soul Cry"
 11. "Mayday"

 Kendrick Lamar - Overly Dedicated
 06. "Opposites Attract (Tomorrow W/O Her)" (featuring JaVonté)
 08. "Ignorance Is Bliss"

 Jay Rock - Black Friday
 01. "No Joke" (featuring Ab-Soul)

2011 
 ScHoolboy Q - Setbacks
 02. "Kamikaze"

 Kendrick Lamar - Section.80
 08. "Poe Man's Dream (His Voice)" (featuring GLC)
 12. "Rigamortus" (produced with Sounwave)

 Jay Rock - Follow Me Home
 04. "No Joke" (featuring Ab-Soul)
 09. "All I Know Is"
 10. "I'm Thuggin'"
 11. "Kill or Be Killed" (featuring Tech N9ne and Krizz Kaliko)

2012 
 ScHoolboy Q - Habits & Contradictions
 11. "Gangsta in Designer (No Concept)"

 Ab-Soul - Control System
 12. "Showin' Love"
 17. "Black Lip Bastard (Remix)" (featuring Black Hippy)

 Wale - Folarin
 14. "Fa We We Freestyle"

2013 
 Freddie Gibbs - Evil Seeds Grow Naturally
 06. "Lay It Down"

 Raven Sorvino - Queen of HeArts
 07. "In My Mind" (featuring A$ton Matthews, Mike G and Maxo Kream)

 Eric Bellinger - Your Favorite Christmas Songs
 07. "Chestnuts Roasting"

2014 
 ScHoolboy Q - Oxymoron
 07. "Prescription / Oxymoron" (produced with Sounwave)

 J. Cole - 2014 Forest Hills Drive
 04. "03' Adolescence"

2015 
 Mickey Taelor - HiiGrade Vol. 2
 07. "Gemini 2.0 (featuring DJ Rhettmatic)
 09. "Love In Time (produced with DAE ONE)
 10. "Wassup" (Willie B Remix)

2016 
 J. Cole - Forest Hills Drive: Live
 04. "03' Adolescence (Live)"

 Mickey Taelor - Essentials
 01. "Essentials (Intro)"
 02. "XYZ (Julie’s Song)"
 03. "This Iz 4 U" (produced with Don Parker)
 04. "3stacks"
 05. "Work It Out" (produced with J. Anthny)
 06. "Trainwreck" 
 07. "Gemini 3.0" (featuring J. Anthny)
 09. "Complicated" (featuring Boogie)
 10. "Love Architects/Roll Up" (feat. Stoney Tha Dealer)

 ScHoolboy Q - Blank Face LP
 14. "Black Thoughts"

 J. Anthny - Two Sides EP
 02. "Where's Your Money" (produced with J. Anthny)
 03. "My NY Bitch"
 04. "Two Sides" (featuring Elle Pierre)
 05. "Down" (produced with J. Anthny)
 06. "What You Want" (featuring Jessica Jolia)
 07. "Risky (Interlude)"
 10. "100 Miles" (featuring Mickey Taelor and Chevy Jones) [produced with J. Anthny]

 Ab-Soul - Do What Thou Wilt.
 03. "Huey Knew THEN" (featuring Da$H)

 J.I.D - "BRUUUH - Single"
 1. "BRUUUH"

2017 
 Daylyt & Willie B - "Let There B Lyt"
 01. "Let There B Lyt"
 02. "Finnessegawd" [produced with DJ Swish]
 03. "First Breath"
 04. "King of Thuh Dot" (featuring J.Anthny)
 05. "Ratchets"
 06. "Girl Shit" (featuring Mickey Taelor)
 07. "Day Electronica" (featuring Chevy Jones)
 08. "Queen"
 09. "Last Breath"

 J. Cole
00. "Want You to Fly"

References 

Living people
African-American male rappers
Rappers from Los Angeles
African-American record producers
American hip hop record producers
West Coast hip hop musicians
21st-century American rappers
Record producers from California
21st-century American male musicians
1983 births
21st-century African-American musicians
20th-century African-American people